West Kirby and Thurstaston (previously Irby-Pensby-Thurstaston, 1973 to 1979, and Thurstaston, 1979 to 2004) is a Wirral Metropolitan Borough Council ward in the Wirral West Parliamentary constituency.

Councillors

References

Wards of Merseyside
Politics of the Metropolitan Borough of Wirral
Wards of the Metropolitan Borough of Wirral